Nakaw Na Pag-ibig is a 1980 Filipino drama film directed by Lino Brocka. The character  was played by acclaimed actress Nora Aunor, and Philip Salvador The film is about an ambitious man who left his girlfriend for a more affluent woman.

Plot
Corazon Rivera (Nora Aunor) is a factory worker in a textile firm. Her live-in partner is her ambitious co-worker, Robert de Asis (Phillip Salvador), a law student. One day, she finds herself pregnant; he is not pleased with the news. Nevertheless, they are married in civil rites. He does not inform his office of his change in status. He is about to get himself into the good graces of his boss. He is made the boss’ chauffeur. Cynthia Ocampo (Hilda Koronel), the boss’ daughter, falls in love with him and also becomes pregnant. They plan a church wedding. But first, he must get rid of his first wife. He attempts to push her off a cliff in Baguio. He changes his mind but the hysterical woman slips and falls to her death. He is sentenced to a prison term.

Cast
Nora Aunor as Corazon Rivera
Phillip Salvador as Robert de Asis
Hilda Koronel as Cynthia Ocampo
Bongchi Miraflor 
Ernie Zarate

Critical response
Isagani Cruz, writing for the Movie Times, wrote that "The film succeeds as far as the psychological portrayal of Salvador's character is concerned. As he rises in social class, he falls in strength of will and integrity."

References

External links

1980 films
1980 drama films
Films directed by Lino Brocka
Philippine drama films